The 1972 British League Division Two season was the second tier of motorcycle speedway in Great Britain.

Summary
The league still consisted of 17 teams with two teams leaving the league and two teams entering. The Rochdale Hornets had disbanded for good at the end of the previous season, whilst Ipswich Witches moved up to the British League. Two newly created teams Ellesmere Port Gunners and Scunthorpe Saints joined the league. The Romford Bombers promotion and team moved to the West Ham Stadium replacing the defunct West Ham Hammers at the stadium but halfway through the season, they moved again to become Barrow Happy Faces as their sponsor at the time was Duckhams Oil - its happy face logo was prominently displayed on the team's race jackets.  

Crewe Kings won their first title and completed the league and cup double. Crewe were led by their Australian Phil Crump who finished top of the league averages and won the Riders' Championship. John Jackson also finished with an impressive average, as did their new signing Australian international Garry Flood. Flood would only ride the one season in speedway and would go on to win eight Australian Motocross Championships.

Final table

British League Division Two Knockout Cup
The 1972 British League Division Two Knockout Cup (sponsored by the Speedway Express) was the fifth edition of the Knockout Cup for tier two teams. Crewe Kings were the winners of the competition.

First round

Second round

Quarter-finals

Semi-finals

Final
First leg

Second leg

Crewe were declared Knockout Cup Champions, winning on aggregate 89–67.

Leading final averages

Riders' final averages
Barrow

Bob Coles 8.61
Mike Sampson 8.35
Mike Watkin 6.75
Tom Owen 5.36
Ian Hindle 4.95
Chris Roynon 4.57
Bobby Campbell 4.36
Keith Evans 4.33
Alan Mackie 3.69

Berwick

Jimmy Gallacher 8.35 
Andy Meldrum 8.35 
Doug Templeton 8.31 
Willie Templeton 7.27
Jim Beaton 6.34
Graham Jones 4.26
George Beaton 4.00
Geoff Davies 3.87
Dennis Jackson 3.07
Alistair Brady 2.53

Birmingham

Pete Bailey 9.57
Arthur Browning 9.42
George Major 7.87
Terry Shearer 7.55
Mick Hines 7.34
Malcolm Corradine 6.00
Mike Lanham 5.94
Cliff Emms 5.83
Archie Wilkinson 5.00
Mike Gardner 4.32
Steve Wilson 3.84

Boston

Arthur Price 9.10 
Jim Ryman 8.58 
Russ Osborne 7.72 
Carl Glover 7.38
Tony Featherstone 6.38
Ray Bales 6.27
Vic Cross 5.87
Jack Bywater 5.23

Bradford

Dave Baugh 8.69
Alan Knapkin 8.11
Robin Adlington 7.89
Colin Meredith 5.92
Alf Wells 5.92
Alan Bridget 5.82
Barry Meeks 4.81
Sid Sheldrick 4.73
Mick Fielding 3.88
Mick Fairbairn 3.54

Canterbury

Ross Gilbertson 9.46
Graham Banks 7.62
Ted Hubbard 7.26
Dave Piddock 7.03
Bob Hughes 6.46
Barney Kennett 6.25
Les Rumsey 4.87
Trevor Jones 4.31
Charlie Benham 3.49
Mike Vernam 3.33
Gary Cottham Sr. 3.20

Crewe

Phil Crump 11.13
John Jackson 10.03
Garry Flood 8.40
Dai Evans 12 
Dave Morton 6.60 
Dave Parry 5.76 
Peter Nicholas 5.00 
Garry Moore 4.56

Eastbourne

Malcolm Ballard 9.94 
Gordon Kennett 8.68
Bobby McNeil 7.84
Roger Johns 7.24
Reg Trott 5.60
Trevor Geer 5.51
Derek Cook 5.42
Paul Gachet 5.14
Simon Bruce 3.91

Ellesmere Port

Paul Tyrer 8.47
Graham Drury 6.56 
Colin Goad 6.42
Robbie Gardner 6.40
Cyril Francis 5.65
Ian Gills 5.41
Chris Blythe 4.50
Paul Callaghan 4.45
Geoff Pusey 1.90

Hull

Tony Childs 9.03
Dave Mills 8.59
Robin Amundson 7.73
Stan Stevens 6.76
Dennis Gavros 5.71
Bryan Loakes 5.40
Pete Boston 4.95
Clark Facey 4.54
Dennis Wasden 4.31
Colin Tucker 4.15
Bernie Hornby 1.82

Long Eaton

Geoff Bouchard 8.06
Roger Mills 7.95
Joe Hughes 6.29
Steve Bass 5.77
Chris Harrison 4.42
Peter Jarvis 4.05
Cliff Emms 3.40
Phil Whittaker 3.39
Gil Farmer 3.06
Ian Champion 2.67
Brian Woodhouse 1.56

Peterborough

Richard Greer 10.03
John Harrhy 9.93 (7 matches only)
John Davis 8.13 
Roy Carter 8.12 
Clive Noy 6.63
Ted Howgego 6.57 
Alan Witt 5.09
Brian Clark 5.05
Pete Saunders 5.04
Frank Smith 4.67
John Amies 4.12
David Ashby 3.89

Rayleigh

Geoff Maloney 10.34
Bob Young 8.74
Brian Foote 8.67
Allen Emmett 8.21 
Trevor Barnwell 6.22
Dingle Brown 6.12
Dave "Tiger" Beech 5.90
Nigel Rackett 5.12
Ivan Miller 5.04
Peter Claridge 4.38
Terry Stone 3.79

Scunthorpe

Brian Maxted 6.36
Terry Kelly 6.00
Ray Watkins 5.80
Phil Bass 5.78
Doug Underwood 5.08
Ian Wilson 5.00
Rod Haynes 4.79
Brian Osborn 4.07
Alan Bellham 3.70
John Bowerman 3.67
Peter Taylor 2.82

Sunderland

Jack Millen 8.69 
Graeme Smith 8.29
Russ Dent 7.25 
George Barclay 6.88
Dave Gatenby 5.27
Peter Wrathall 4.16
Jim Wells 3.81

Teesside
 
Roger Wright 8.56 
Dave Durham 7.90
Bruce Forrester 7.35
Frank Auffret 6.93
Pete Reading 6.54
Tim Swales 5.97
Mick Moore 5.79
Tony Swales 4.32
Maxwell Clift .3.00

Workington

Taffy Owen 8.8
Lou Sansom 8.53
Malcolm MacKay 8.47
Mitch Graham 6.43
Kym Amundson 5.89
Steve Watson 5.13
Dave Kumeta 4.04
Darryl Stobbart 4.00
Lindsay Davies 3.71

See also
List of United Kingdom Speedway League Champions
Knockout Cup (speedway)

References

Speedway British League Division Two / National League